Mahmut Şenol (born November 23, 1958) is a contemporary Turkish and Canadian author and journalist. He has published 10 books as of April 2016. The author currently lives in Edmonton, Canada.

 Phaselis Adağı (2004) - novel/historical fiction
 Bay Konsolos  (2005) - novel/fiction
 Çerkes Adil Paşa'nın Tahsildarlık Günleri (2007) - novel/fiction 
 Keşfini Bekleyen Insan (2010) - non-fiction
 Kayısı Topuklu Kadınlar (2011) - essays and daily articles
 Akhisar Düşerken (2011) - novel/fiction
 Capon Çayevi (2012) - novel/fiction - 
 Altıncı Hasta (2013) - theatre/play [ 6. Hasta ], this book is available as e-Pub, onto internet
 Geçiyordum, Uğradım (2015) - Short Stories.
 Dalkavuk Hanım (2016) - novel
 Bizim Unuttuğumuz Şey - (2017), Short Stories.
 Bir Roman Yazılıyor~Nicky'yi Öldürmek - (2020 )Fiction

References

Living people
Turkish writers
1958 births